A Florence flask/boiling flask is a type of flask used as an item of laboratory glassware and is named after the city Florence. It is used as a container to hold liquids. A Florence flask has a round body, a long neck, and often a flat bottom. It is designed for uniform heating, boiling, distillation and ease of swirling; it is produced in a number of different glass thicknesses to stand different types of use. They are often made of borosilicate glass for heat and chemical resistance.  Traditional Florence flasks typically do not have a ground glass joint on their rather longer necks, but typically have a slight lip or flange around the tip of the neck.  The common volume for a Florence flask is 1 litre.

References

Laboratory glassware